The reticulate plump-bodied gecko (Cyrtodactylus battalensis) is a species of gecko endemic to Pakistan. It is sometimes placed in the genus Cyrtopodion.

References

Cyrtodactylus
Reptiles described in 1993